Parmena is a genus of longhorn beetles of the subfamily Lamiinae, containing the following species:

 Parmena aurora Danilevsky, 1980
 Parmena balearica Vives, 1998
 Parmena balteus (Linnaeus, 1767)
 Parmena bialookii Danilevsky, 2017
 Parmena bicincta (Kuster, 1849)
 Parmena cruciata Pic, 1912
 Parmena europaea Danilevsky, 2017
 Parmena istanbulensis Danilevsky & Hizal, 2017
 Parmena lukati Sama, 1994
 Parmena meregallii Sama, 1984
 Parmena mutilloides Pesarini & Sabbadini, 1992
 Parmena novaki Sama, 1997
 Parmena pontocircassica Danilevsky & Miroshnikov, 1985
 Parmena pubescens (Dalman, 1817)
 Parmena slamai Sama, 1986
 Parmena soldatii Cocquempot, 2020
 Parmena solieri Mulsant, 1839
 Parmena striatopunctata Sama, 1994
 Parmena subpubescens Hellrigl, 1971
 Parmena unifasciata (Rossi, 1790)

References

Parmenini